Chrysozephyrus duma, the metallic green hairstreak, is a small butterfly found in India that belongs to the lycaenids or blues family.

Subspecies
Chrysozephyrus duma duma
Chrysozephyrus duma desgodinsi (Oberthür, 1886) (western China, Szechwan, Yunnan)
Chrysozephyrus duma makikoae Morita, 2002 (northern Vietnam)

Range
The butterfly occurs in India from Sikkim to Nagaland and Manipur, Bhutan and south western China.

See also
List of butterflies of India (Lycaenidae)

Cited references

References
  
 
 

Chrysozephyrus
Butterflies of Asia